Kappen is a surname. Notable people with the surname include: 

Frank van Kappen (born 1941), Dutch marine and politician
Hanneke Kappen (born 1954), Dutch singer and radio and TV presenter
Joseph Kappen (1941–1990), Welsh serial killer
Sebastian Kappen (1924–1993), Indian Jesuit priest and liberation theologian
Tony Kappen (1919–1993), American basketball player